In propositional logic, the commutativity of conjunction is a valid argument form and truth-functional tautology. It is considered to be a law of classical logic. It is the principle that the conjuncts of a logical conjunction may switch places with each other, while preserving the truth-value of the resulting proposition.

Formal notation 

Commutativity of conjunction can be expressed in sequent notation as:

 

and

 

or in rule form:

and

where the rule is that wherever an instance of "" appears on a line of a proof, it can be replaced with "" and wherever an instance of "" appears on a line of a proof, it can be replaced with "";

or as the statement of a truth-functional tautology or theorem of propositional logic:

and

Generalized principle 
For any propositions H1, H2, ... Hn, and permutation σ(n) of the numbers 1 through n, it is the case that:
 
H1   H2  ...  Hn

is equivalent to

Hσ(1)  Hσ(2)  Hσ(n).

For example, if H1 is
It is raining

H2 is
Socrates is mortal

and H3 is
2+2=4

then

It is raining and Socrates is mortal and 2+2=4

is equivalent to

Socrates is mortal and 2+2=4 and it is raining

and the other orderings of the predicates.

References

Classical logic
Rules of inference
Theorems in propositional logic